Benita Fitzgerald Mosley (formerly Benita Fitzgerald-Brown; born July 6, 1961) is a retired American athlete, who mainly competed in the women's 100 metres hurdles event.

Early life
A native of Warrenton, Virginia, she grew up in nearby Dale City where at an early age, she began to excel in athletics and academics. After graduating from Gar-Field High School, she attended the University of Tennessee on a full athletic scholarship, where she earned a B.S. in industrial engineering. While at Tennessee, she was a fifteen-time All-American and won 4 NCAA titles, including three 100-meter outdoor hurdles championships.

Olympics
Benita Fitzgerald qualified for the 1980 U.S. Olympic track and field team but did not compete due to the U.S. Olympic Committee's boycott of the 1980 Summer Olympics in Moscow, Russia. She was one of 461 athletes to receive a Congressional Gold Medal instead.

She competed for the United States in the 1984 Summer Olympics held in Los Angeles, where she won the Olympic Gold medal in a time of 12.84 seconds, beating favorite Shirley Strong by 0.04 seconds. Fitzgerald is only the second U.S. woman, after Babe Didrikson, and the first African-American woman, to win a gold medal in the 100-meter hurdles. She was also an alternate for the 1988 United States Olympic team.

In 1996, Fitzgerald was honored as one of eight U.S. Olympians to carry the Olympic flag into the stadium during the Opening Ceremony of the Centennial Olympic Games in Atlanta. Fitzgerald has been inducted into numerous halls of fame, including the Virginia High School Hall of Fame, Virginia Sports Hall of Fame, and the University of Tennessee's Lady Volunteers Hall of Fame.

Honors
There is a road named after Fitzgerald in her childhood hometown of Dale City, Virginia. The street can be found off Dale Blvd. between I-95 and Minnieville Rd. Fitzgerald Elementary School, named after her mother Fannie, is located on the road.

References

External links
 
 
 

1961 births
Living people
American female hurdlers
Olympic gold medalists for the United States in track and field
Athletes (track and field) at the 1984 Summer Olympics
People from Woodbridge, Virginia
Sportspeople from the Washington metropolitan area
University of Tennessee alumni
Medalists at the 1984 Summer Olympics
Tennessee Volunteers women's track and field athletes
Track and field athletes from Virginia
Pan American Games gold medalists for the United States
Pan American Games medalists in athletics (track and field)
Congressional Gold Medal recipients
Universiade medalists in athletics (track and field)
Women's Sports Foundation executives
People from Warrenton, Virginia
People from Dale City, Virginia
Athletes (track and field) at the 1983 Pan American Games
Universiade bronze medalists for the United States
Medalists at the 1981 Summer Universiade
Medalists at the 1983 Pan American Games
20th-century American women
21st-century American women